Schoevers is a privately owned educational institution in the Netherlands, training students mainly for administrative positions. It was founded in Amsterdam in 1913 and gained recognition by starting a secretarial course in 1922, which trained young women and did it so successfully that "secretary" was practically synonymous with "Schoevers."

History 

Institute Schoevers was founded by Adriaan Schoevers in January 1913 as a school for trade and office.  The school grew into an institution where training courses can be given and courses can be followed at mbo 3, mbo 4 and hbo (hogeschool) level.

Although administrative support at the beginning of the 20th century was mostly provided by men, more and more women ended up in such jobs.  Adriaan thought that training should be enjoyed with pleasure and taught the girls to type blindly to the rhythm of the Charleston.

References

External links

1913 establishments in the Netherlands
Women and education
Vocational education in the Netherlands